Kim Oh-soo (Korean: 김오수, born January 9, 1963) is a South Korean prosecutor and the Prosecutor General. He previously served as the Deputy Minister of Justice from 2018 until 2020, and briefly the interim Minister of Justice following the resignation of Cho Kuk.

Kim was born in Hongnong-eup, Yeonggwang, South Jeolla in 1963. He studied at Hongnong Secondary School and Gwangju Daedong High School before attending Seoul National University where he studied law.

After qualifying for the bar in 1988, Kim started his career at Incheon District Prosecutor's Office in 1994. He gained public intentions when he investigated corruption allegation of the former Chancellor of Yonsei University Jung Chang-young in 2005. He also investigated alleged corruption of DSME and Hyosung in 2009.

He has also been working at the Ministry of Justice for a long time, where he worked together with Park Sang-ki, Cho Kuk and Choo Mi-ae — all were the Justice Minister under the President Moon Jae-in. In 2018, he was appointed the Deputy Minister of Justice, replacing Lee Keum-ro. Following the resignation of controversial Cho Kuk, Kim became the interim Justice Minister until Choo Mi-ae was appointed to the position.

On 3 May 2021, Kim was nominated the Prosecutor General after the resignation of Yoon Seok-youl who has been in conflict with the Moon Jae-in government. He favours the prosecution reform of the Moon government, such as establishing the Corruption Investigation Office for High-ranking Officials. On 31 May, the National Assembly voted in favour of his appointment, despite the boycott of the oppositions.

He married Cheon Kye-sook; the couple has a son and a daughter.

Kim resigned from his post and submitted his resignation to outgoing President Moon on May 6, days before Moon left office. Kim resigned in protest against the outgoing Democratic Party's legislation to strip the prosecutor service of investigative powers.

References 

1963 births
Living people
Prosecutors General of South Korea